Petros IV may refer to:

 Patriarch Peter IV of Alexandria, ruled in 642–651
 Basile Petros IV Avkadian, ruled in 1780–1788